This is a list of governors of Roman Cyprus, compiled from known inscriptions and surviving texts both literary and documentary. Until the reign of Diocletian, Cyprus was governed by a pro praetor with proconsular authority.

References 

 
Cyprus